Evley "'Joe" Sharp  (1906–2006) was an Australian rugby league footballer who played in the 1920s and 1930s.

Sharp played 32 First-grade games (including trial matches) for St. George during four seasons from 1929 to 1932. Former Club secretary and NSWRFL Vice President Clarrie Fahy recruited him after spotting the rangy forward running around for a railways side at Katoomba in the Blue Mountains in 1928.

"They were all good moments," Mr Sharp recalled of his years with the Saints. "St George was a great club. 'Snowy' Justice was the captain at the time. He was the hooker – I liked him and I got on well with him.".

After 4 seasons at Saints, Joe Sharp joined Balmain in 1933 and later Canterbury-Bankstown due to residential rules of the time.

Sharp died on 31 July 2006 aged 100 at East Gosford, New South Wales.

References

1906 births
2006 deaths
Australian rugby league players
St. George Dragons players
Balmain Tigers players
Canterbury-Bankstown Bulldogs players
Rugby league players from New South Wales
Rugby league second-rows